Buriram City Stadium or Khao Kradong Stadium, is a football stadium in Buriram, Thailand. It is used for football matches. The stadium's capacity is 8,000 spectators.

External links
Stadium information

Buildings and structures in Buriram province
Football venues in Thailand